Events in the year 1929 in Japan. It corresponds to Shōwa 4 (昭和4年) in the Japanese calendar.

Incumbents
Emperor: Hirohito
Prime Minister: 
Tanaka Giichi: until July 2
Osachi Hamaguchi: from July 2

Governors
Aichi Prefecture: Toyoji Obata (until 5 July); Masao Oka (starting 5 July)
Akita Prefecture: Iwao Koinuma (until 5 January); Shinji Kikuchi (starting 5 January)
Aomori Prefecture: 
 until 30 January: Tetsuzo Yoshimura  
 30 January-5 July: Yujiro Shinjo
 starting 5 July: Mitsuo Hirai 
Ehime Prefecture: Keizo Ichimura (until 8 November); Shin Kinoshita (starting 8 November)
Fukui Prefecture: Joko Obama 
Fukuoka Prefecture: Saito Morikuni (starting month unknown)
Fukushima Prefecture: Aid Kiyoo (until 5 July); Koyanagi Makimamoru (starting 5 July)
Gifu Prefecture: Masao Kanazawa (until 5 July); Ken Usawa (starting 5 July)
Gunma Prefecture: Omori Keiichi (until 10 September); Hotta Kanae (starting 10 September)
Hiroshima Prefecture: Masao Kishimoto (until 5 July); Hiroshi Kawabuchi (starting 5 July)
Ibaraki Prefecture: Jiro Morioka (until 5 July); Shozo Ushijima (starting 5 July)
Ishikawa Prefecture: Nakano Kunikazu (starting month unknown)
Iwate Prefecture: Tojiro Io (until 5 July); Shichiro Niwa (starting 5 July)
Kagawa Prefecture: Toshio Motoda (until 5 July); Susumu Tsuboi (starting 5 July)
Kanagawa Prefecture: Ikeda Hiroshi (until month unknown); Jiro Yamagata (starting month unknown)
Kochi Prefecture: Ichiro Oshima (until 5 July); Tanaka (starting 5 July)
Kumamoto Prefecture: Saito Munenori (until month unknown); Omori Kichigoro (starting month unknown)
Kyoto Prefecture: Shigeyoshi Omihara (until July); Shinichi Sagami (starting July)
Mie Prefecture: Iori Hanada (until 8 November); Keizo Ichimura (starting 8 November)
Miyagi Prefecture: Katorataro Ushizu (until 9 October); Michio Yuzawa (starting 9 October)
Miyazaki Prefecture: Kunitoshi Yamaoka (until 5 July); Kaoru Ishida (starting 5 July)
Nagano Prefecture: Ryo Chiba (until 5 July); Shintaro Suzuki (starting 5 July)
Niigata Prefecture: Ozaki Yujiro (until 5 July); Takeo Mimatsu (starting 5 July)
Okayama Prefecture: Masao Kishimoto (until month unknown); Minabe Choji (starting month unknown)
Okinawa Prefecture: Chōhei Hosokawa (until 5 July); Masao Moriya (starting 5 July)
Osaka Prefecture: Yuichiro Chikaraishi
Saitama Prefecture: 
 until 6 February: Miyawaki Umekichi
 6 February-5 July: Shirane Takekai
 starting 5 July: Chohei Hosokawa
Shiname Prefecture: Rinsaku Yagi 
Tochigi Prefecture: 
 until 5 July: Takeichi Fujiyama
 5 July-8 November: Jiro Morioka
 starting 8 November: Harada
Tokyo: 
 until 9 October: Hiroshi Hiratsuka
 5 July-9 October: Kenzo Kakagawa
 starting 9 October: Torataro Shizuka
Toyama Prefecture: Shirane Takesuke (until 8 February); Kozo Yamanaka (starting 8 February)
Yamagata Prefecture: Shinohara Eitaro (until 9 October); Kubota Osamu Kosuke (starting 9 October)

Events
January 27 – An auto parts brand, Akebono Brake was founded, as predecessor name of Akebono Asbest Manufacturing.
April 1 - openings of Kugenuma-Kaigan Station, Satte Station and Tochigi Station
April 15 – Hankyu Department Store Osaka Umeda officially open in Kita-ku, Osaka.
October 1 - opening of Tōbu-Nikkō Station
November 17 - opening of Iwatsuki Station
December 15 - opening of Bungo-Mori Station
opening of the Beppu Rakutenchi Cable Line
founded of Pola Orbis, as predecessor name was Pola Chemical Industries in Shizuoka City.

Films
Akeyuku Sora
Days of Youth
Sakanaya Honda

Births

January 1 – Haruo Nakajima, actor, stuntman, and choreographer (d. 2017)
January 16 – Shigeru Koyama, actor (d. 2017)
January 20 – Masaharu Kawakatsu, zoologist 
January 23 – Kenji Suzuki, announcer 
January 26 – Sumiteru Taniguchi, survivor of the Nagasaki atomic bombing, and anti–nuclear weapons activist (d. 2017)
January 30 –  Isamu Akasaki, physicist and engineer, Nobel Prize laureate (d. 2021)
February 13 – Frankie Sakai, comedian, actor, and musician (d. 1996)
February 14
Hirokazu Kobayashi, aikidoka (d. 1998)
Masamoto Yashiro, businessman
March 20 – Kazue Takahashi, voice actress (d. 1999)
March 22 – Yayoi Kusama, artist
March 28 – Takehiro Irokawa, writer (d. 1989)
April 3 – Shinichiro Sakurai, automotive engineer (d. 2011)
April 6 – Shoichi Ozawa, actor, radio host and singer (d. 2012)
April 10 – Yozo Aoki, football player (d. 2014)
May 8 – Miyoshi Umeki, actress (d. 2007)
June 1 – Tatsuro Toyoda, businessman (d. 2017)
June 4 – Nakamura Tomijūrō V, Kabuki actor (d. 2011)
July 5 – Chikao Ohtsuka, voice actor (d. 2015)
September 29 – Tōru Ōhira, voice actor (d. 2016)
September 30 – Kazuko, Princess Taka, later "Kazuko Takatsukasa", daughter of Emperor Shōwa (d. 1989)
October 4 – Chokei Kishaba, Okinawan martial arts master (d. 2000)
November 7 – Akio Suzuki, medical scientist, educator (d. 2010)
November 17 – Gorō Naya, voice actor (d. 2013)
November 28 – Kuniko Mukōda, screenwriter (d. 1981)
December 12 – Toshiko Akiyoshi, jazz composer/arranger, bandleader and pianist
Unknown – Akihiko Okamura, photographer (d. 1985)

Deaths
February 10 – Nagai Nagayoshi, chemist and pharmacologist (b. 1844)
March 22 – Inoue Yoshika, Marshal Admiral (b. 1845)
April 13 – Gotō Shinpei, politician and scouting pioneer (b. 1857)
April 27 – Hōjō Tokiyuki, educator, mathematician and politician (b. 1858)
June 29 – Prince Kuniyoshi Kuni, prince and field marshal (b. 1873)
July 25 – Shōzō Makino silent film director and producer (b. 1878)
August 16 – Tsuda Umeko, educator (b. 1864)
August 26 – Ernest Mason Satow, British scholar, diplomat and Japanologist (b. 1843)
September 29 – Tanaka Giichi, general and Prime Minister of Japan (b. 1864)
November 22 – Kamakichi Kishinouye, marine biologist and cnidariologist (b. 1867)
December 20 – Ryūsei Kishida, painter (b. 1891)

See also
List of Japanese films of the 1920s

References

References

 
1920s in Japan
Japan